Fort Thomas or St. Thomas Fort or Fortaleza da São Tomé, also known as Tangasseri Fort, is a ruined fort located in the beach town of Tangasseri on the shores of the Arabian Sea in the city of Kollam, Kerala, India.

History 

Tangasseri was associated with the Chinese trade from the first millennium AD and later colonised by the Portuguese, Dutch and the British to become the "gold village". According to Historians, Captain Rodriguez came to Quilon and was appointed as the captain of the factory and trade, with permission from the queen. St.Thomas Fort (once known as Fortaleza da São Tomé) was built by the Portuguese under Afonso de Albuquerque for the protection of the newly developed trade. In 1505 the Portuguese established a trading port here, and in 1518 established its sovereignty through the construction of Fort St. Thomas. Later in 1661 the town and the fort were handed over to the Dutch who made it the capital of Dutch Malabar. The Dutch occupied the fort for several years. In 1795, the British East India Company took possession of the fort. In 1823 Fort St. Thomas accepted a lease by Travancore from the British government for a period of twenty years.

Today, the remains of the fort, popularly known as "Tangasseri fort" remain facing the beach. The government of India has taken over the fort and it is being considered an historical landmark. Restoration of the fort is ongoing. At present, the fort is managed by the Archaeological Survey of India (ASI).

Gallery

References

External links 

 "Mining rampant at Tangasseri fort"
 "Tangaserri a brief history"

Forts in Kerala
Portuguese forts in India
Buildings and structures in Kollam
History of Kollam
Colonial Kerala
Dutch India
Portuguese in Kerala
Kingdom of Travancore
16th-century forts in India
1510s establishments in Portuguese India
1518 establishments in India
Cities and towns in Kollam district
Tourist attractions in Kollam
Archaeological sites in Kerala
Portuguese colonial architecture in India
Monuments of National Importance in Kerala